Art Jones may refer to:

 Art Jones (baseball) (1906–1980), pitcher in Major League Baseball
 Art Jones (American football) (1919–1995), American football defensive back
 Art Jones (ice hockey) (1935–2021), Canadian ice hockey centre
 Art Jones (politician) (born 1948), American Neo-Nazi, Holocaust denier and politician
 Art C. Jones, American football coach in the United States

See also
Arthur Jones (disambiguation)